This is a list of Romanian diplomats. Most of these people made at least a significant portion of their career in the Romanian or foreign diplomatic services.

A 

 Vasile Alecsandri
 Constantin Antoniade
 Constantin Argetoianu
 Mihail Arion
 Radu Scarlat Arion

Back to top

B 

 Victor Bădulescu
 Nineta Barbulescu
 Anton Bibescu
 Grigore Bilciurescu
 Lucian Blaga
 Mihail Boerescu
 Raoul Bossy
 Caius Brediceanu

Back to top

C 

 Nicolae Calimachi-Catargiu
 Victor Cădere
 Alejandro Ciorănescu
 Edmond Ciuntu
 Grigore Constantinescu
 Noti Constantinide
 Brutus Coste
 Aron Cotruş
 Alexandru Cretzianu
 George Cretzianu
 Radu Crutzescu
 Grigore Cugler
 Radu Cutzarida

Back to top

D 

 Carol Citta Davila
 Aurel Decei
 Gheorghe Derussi
 Neagu Djuvara
 Dimitrie Drăghicescu
 Gheorghe Duca

Back to top

E 

 Theodor Emandi

Back to top

F 

 Eugen Filotti
 Richard Franasovici

Back to top

G 

 Grigore Gafencu
 Constantin Virgil Gheorghiu
 Dimitrie Ghika
 Ion Ghica
 Matila Ghyka
 Constantin Grecianu
 Vasile Grigorcea
 Alexandru Gurănescu

Back to top

H 

 Dinu Hiott
 Andrei Corbea Hoişie

Back to top

I 

 Alexandru Iacovaki

Back to top

J 

Back to top

K 

 Constantin Karadja

Back to top

L 

 Alexandru Emanuel Lahovary
 Filip Lanovari 
 Ion Lahovary
 Nicolae Lahovary
 Constantin Langa-Răşcanu
 George Lecca

Back to top

M 

 Mircea Maliţa
 Corneliu Mănescu
 Simona Miculescu
 Nicolae Milescu
 Nicolae Mişu

Back to top

N 

 Frederic Nanu

Back to top

P 

 Alexandru Paleologu
 Ion Pangal
 Vespasian Pella
 Nicolae Petrescu-Comnen
 Dumitru Prunariu

Back to top

Q 

Back to top

R 

 Mihail Ralea
 Savel Rădulescu
 Victor Rădulescu-Pogoneanu
 Mirela Roznoveanu

Back to top

S 

 Teodor Solacolu
 Petre Stoica
 Vasile Stoica

Back to top

T 

 Alexandru Teriachiu
 Viorel Virgil Tilea
 Nicolae Țimiraș
 Nicolae Titulescu
 Alexandru Totescu

Back to top

U 

Back to top

V 

 Ion Aurel Vassiliu
 Tudor Vianu
 Constantin Vişoianu

Back to top

W 

Back to top

X 

Back to top

Y 

Back to top

Z 

 Alexandru Zamfirescu
 Duiliu Zamfirescu

Back to top